is a song by Rie Tomosaka, written by rock musician Ringo Shiina. The song was used as an ending theme song for the Nippon Television variety show Fun.

Rie Tomosaka version

Background

Ringo Shiina had previously worked with Tomosaka on her 1999 album, . She had written the lead single, "Cappuccino," the B-side to the single  and the album track .

Conception

Shiina created a temporary 5 piece band to record the single, and named it . Along with Tomosaka on vocals and Shiina on piano/back-up vocals, Hisako Tabuchi of Number Girl/Bloodthirsty Butchers featured as the band's guitarist.

The songs on the single were created in the vein of Shiina's Shōso Strip album (released three months prior). "Shōjo Robot" and "Ikenai Ko" were written with Tomosaka's image in mind, while "Nippon ni Umarete" was an unused demo from the Shōso Strip sessions.

Release

The song was a hit for Tomosaka, it being her highest charting single since 1997's "Naichaisō yo." It debuted at #12 on the Oricon singles chart, and stayed in the top 20 for two weeks.

The single was released nine months after the release of her greatest hits collection Rie Tomosaka Best, hence was not compiled in it. "Shōjo Robot" features as track #16 of the Taiwan only greatest hits album Daisuki!, which was released simultaneously as this single in Taiwan.

All three songs were later compiled onto the 2009 re-release of Rie Tomosaka Best called Rie Tomosaka Best+3.

Music video

The music video was shot by director . It depicts Tomosaka performing the song in a room with wall partitions lit with different colour themes. her back-up band consists of a pianist, a guitarist and a drummer -  all played by Ringo Shiina.

The music video has never been released to DVD, as Tomosaka's music video clip collection Rie Tomosaka Clips was released in October 1999 and she has not released a DVD since.

As of January 4, 2010 the music video for "Shōjo Robot" has been viewed over 182,000 times on popular video-sharing website YouTube.

Track listing

All songs written and produced by Ringo Shiina.

Oricon Album Chart Ranking (Japan)

Release history

Tokyo Jihen version

Originally, Sheena performed live covers of "Shōjo Robot" and "Nippon ni Umarete" at her July 30, 2000 Zazen Xstasy concert, and later "Ikenai Ko" at her Gekkō Kuon Taizu concert on November 25, 2000.

Later, with her band Tokyo Jihen, they covered "Shōjo Robot" live at their "Domestic!" Just Can't Help It. tour (April 7, 2005 - May 30, 2005). The song, as well as Blackout and Mirror-ball, received a promotional live music video, which was aired on music video channels in promotion of the DVD.

Track list

References 

Rie Tomosaka songs
Tokyo Jihen songs
Ringo Sheena songs
2000 songs
2000 singles
2006 singles
Songs written by Ringo Sheena